Encoptolophus is a genus of band-winged grasshoppers in the family Acrididae. There are about 8 described species in Encoptolophus.

Species
 Encoptolophus californicus Bruner, 1905
 Encoptolophus costalis (Scudder, 1863) (western clouded grasshopper)
 Encoptolophus fuliginosus Bruner, 1905
 Encoptolophus otomitus (Saussure, 1861)
 Encoptolophus pallidus Bruner, 1893 (pale clouded grasshopper)
 Encoptolophus robustus Rehn & Hebard, 1909 (coast clouded grasshopper)
 Encoptolophus sordidus (Burmeister, 1838) (clouded grasshopper)
 Encoptolophus subgracilis Caudell, 1903 (southwestern dusky grasshopper)

References

Further reading

 
 

Oedipodinae